Kot Radha Kishan is a tehsil located in Kasur District, Punjab, Pakistan. The population is 360,330 according to the 2017 census.

See also 
 List of tehsils of Punjab, Pakistan

References 

Tehsils of Punjab, Pakistan
Populated places in Dera Ghazi Khan District